John Riley may refer to:

Arts and entertainment
 John Riley (painter) (1646–1691), British portrait painter
 John Riley (poet) (1937–1978), English poet associated with the British Poetry Revival
 John Bernard Riley (born 1954), jazz drummer

Sports
 John Riley (Scottish footballer), Scottish footballer
 John Riley (rower) (born 1964), American rower
 John P. Riley Jr. (1920–2016), American ice hockey coach
 Jack Riley (American football) (John Horn Riley, 1909–1993), American wrestler who later turned to American football
 John Riley (rugby league), rugby league footballer of the 1900s
 John Riley (ice hockey), 1963–1966 head coach of Wisconsin Badgers men's ice hockey
 John Riley (motorcyclist), in the 1976 and 1977 Isle of Man TT
 John Riley (racing driver), in the 1965 and 1966 Tasman Series

Other
 John Riley (botanist), founder of California Rare Fruit Growers
 John Riley (physicist) (born 1958), Defence scientist and former VFL and SANFL footballer
 John E. Riley (1909–2001), president of the Northwest Nazarene College
 John H. Riley (1947–1994), American attorney and railroad transportation administrator
 John J. Riley (1895–1962), American politician, U.S. Representative from South Carolina
 John Riley (soldier) (1805–1850), or John O'Riley, Irish-American soldier who defected from the US Army and formed the Saint Patrick's Battalion to fight for Mexico
 John Riley (mayor), mayor of Opa-Locka, Florida

Other uses
 "John Riley" (song), a traditional English folk song

See also
 John Phillip Rilley (1877–1950), landsman serving in the United States Navy during the Spanish–American War
 Johnny Riley, Australian rugby league player
 Jack Riley (disambiguation)
 John Reilly (disambiguation)
 John Gilmore Riley House, a historic home in Tallahassee, Florida